Amanda Adkins may refer to:

 Amanda Adkins (politician) (born 1974/1975), American politician and businesswoman
 Amanda Adkins (swimmer) (born 1976), American competition swimmer